Doto duao is a species of sea slug, a nudibranch, a marine gastropod mollusc in the family Dotidae.

Distribution
This species was described from the Caribbean coast of Costa Rica.

Description
This nudibranch is translucent white with fine brown spotting on the top and sides of the body and clear patches around the bases of the cerata. The cerata have a blue iridescence and the tubercles have internal blue spots. There is always a crescent-shaped red spot on the inner base of the peduncle at the insertion of cerata into the body.

The maximum recorded body length is 6 mm.

Ecology
Minimum recorded depth is 10 m. Maximum recorded depth is 19 m.

Doto duao was found associated with small hydroids of the family Sertulariidae; these are probably its prey.

References

External links

Dotidae
Gastropods described in 2001